As Above, So Below is the seventh studio release by American duo Azure Ray, consisting of Maria Taylor and Orenda Fink. It was originally released on September 4, 2012, on Saddle Creek Records and features co-production by Andy LeMaster and Todd Fink (of The Faint). Following a 2-year hiatus after the release of Drawing Down the Moon, Fink and a pregnant Taylor entered the studio to record six news songs, with a more "hypnotic" "electronica" influence in collaboration with Andy LeMaster and Todd Fink. On July 17, 2012, Stereogum premiered the "starry, shivering cut" “Scattered Like Leaves.” NPR premiered "Red Balloon" on August 9, 2012, calling the "long, slow summer swoon," "devastating melancholy." Rolling Stone premiered the full EP stream on August 28, 2012.

Track listing 
 "Scattered Like Leaves" 
 "Red Balloon"
 "Unannounced"
 "To This Life"
 "The Heart Has Its Reasons"
 "We Could Wake"

Personnel
All songs written by Azure Ray.
 Andy LeMaster - production, engineer, mixing
 Todd Fink  - production, artwork
 Jadon Ulrich - artwork
 Daniel Farris - mastering
 Ben Brodin - guitar sample on "Scattered Like Leaves"

References 

2012 EPs
Azure Ray albums
Saddle Creek Records EPs
Albums produced by Andy LeMaster